Maxime Poundjé (born 16 August 1992) is a French professional footballer who plays as a defender.

Club career
On 13 February 2022, Poundjé signed with Lausanne-Sport in Switzerland.

International career
Poundjé was born in France to parents of Cameroonian descent. He is a former youth international for France, and has received a callup to the Cameroon national football team which he rejected.

References

External links
 
 

1992 births
French sportspeople of Cameroonian descent
Living people
French footballers
France youth international footballers
Footballers from Bordeaux
Association football defenders
Ligue 1 players
Championnat National players
Championnat National 2 players
Championnat National 3 players
Swiss Super League players
FC Girondins de Bordeaux players
Nîmes Olympique players
FC Lausanne-Sport players
French expatriate footballers
Expatriate footballers in Switzerland
French expatriate sportspeople in Switzerland
Black French sportspeople